Mildred Pierce is a psychological drama by James M. Cain published by Alfred A. Knopf in 1941.

A story of “social inequity and opportunity in America" set during the Great Depression, Mildred Pierce follows the trajectory of a lower-middle class divorcee with two children in her tragic struggle to achieve financial and personal success.  The novel is one of four major works Cain wrote featuring opera as a key component in the plot (Serenade (1937), Career in C Major (1938) and The Moth (1948) are the others.)

Mildred Pierce is Cain’s first effort to write a novel in the third-person narrative form, a departure from his earlier works of the 1930s, all of them confessional narratives written in the first-person.

Plot

Set in Glendale, California in the 1930s, the book is the story of a middle-class housewife, Mildred Pierce, and her attempts to maintain her family's social position during the Great Depression.

Mildred separates from Bert, her unemployed husband, and sets out to support herself and her children. After a difficult search, she finds a job as a waitress, but she worries that it is beneath her middle-class station. More than that, she worries that her ambitious and increasingly pretentious elder daughter, Veda, will think her new job demeaning. Mildred encounters both success and failure as she opens three successful restaurants, operates a pie-selling business, and copes with the death of her younger daughter, Ray. Veda enjoys her mother's newfound financial success but increasingly turns ungrateful, demanding more and more from her hard-working mother while openly condemning her and anyone else who must work for a living.

When Mildred discovers her daughter's plot to blackmail a wealthy family with a fake pregnancy, she kicks her out of their house. Veda, who has been training to become an opera singer, goes on to great fame, and Mildred's increasing obsession with her daughter leads her to use her former lover, Monty (a man who, like Mildred, lost his family's wealth at the start of the Great Depression), and his social status and connection to bring Veda back into her life. Unfortunately for Mildred, this means buying Monty's family estate and using her earnings to pay for Veda's extravagances. Mildred and Monty marry, but things go sour as her lavish lifestyle and neglect of her businesses have dramatically affected the company's profits. Creditors line up, led by Wally, a former business associate of Bert's, with whom Mildred had a brief affair upon their separation. With no one to turn to, Mildred confesses to Bert that she has been embezzling money from her company in order to buy Veda's love.

Having decided that the only course of action is to ask Veda to contribute some of her now considerable earnings to balance the books and fearing that Wally might target the girl's assets if they are exposed Mildred goes to her room to confront her. She finds Veda in bed with her stepfather. Monty reproaches Mildred for using him to bring Veda back and for her attitude to him as a financial dependent of hers, while Veda affects boredom but joins in to chide Mildred for embarrassing her and taking glory in her success. Mildred snaps, brutally attacking and strangling her daughter, who now appears incapable of singing and loses her singing contract.

Weeks pass as Mildred moves to Reno, Nevada to establish residency in order to get a speedy divorce from Monty. Bert visits her. Mildred ultimately is forced to resign from her business empire, leaving it to Ida, a former company assistant. Bert and Mildred, upon the finalization of her divorce, remarry. Veda travels to Reno and apparently reconciles with Mildred, but several months later, Veda reveals that her voice has healed and announces that she is moving to New York City with Monty. The "reconciliation" (which had been accompanied by reporters and photographers) was designed to defuse the negative publicity resulting from the affair with her stepfather, and it emerges the apparent loss of her voice was a ploy so that she could renege on her existing singing contract and be free to take up a more lucrative one offered by another company. As she leaves the house, a broken Mildred, encouraged by Bert, eventually says "to hell" with the monstrous Veda, and the pair agree to get "stinko" (drunk).

Characters
 Mildred Pierce – a middle-class mother of two
 Bert Pierce – Mildred's first and, later, her third husband
 Moire ("Ray") Pierce – Mildred's younger daughter
 Veda Pierce – Mildred's elder daughter
 Wally Burgan – Bert's former business partner
 Monty Beragon – a wealthy playboy, Mildred's lover and later her second husband
 Lucy Gessler –  Mildred's friend
 Ida Corwin –  Mildred's supervisor; later business partner

Publication history

Cain’s desire to write a novel about “a grass widow with two small children to support” had its origins in 1932 from a suggestion by fellow writer James McGuiness, and went through numerous plot and character permutations during the years of the Great Depression.

Mildred Pierce is the third of his four novels in which Cain incorporated Grand opera, for which he had trained as a baritone in his youth.

Kate Cummings, mother of Hollywood actress Constance Cummings, became a friend, a lover and a literary advisor to Cain during the writing of Mildred Pierce. Their relationship ended in 1943, in part due to Cain’s heavy drinking. Cummings provided Cain with insights essential to the development of his female protagonists in Mildred Pierce. Cain freely acknowledged that Cummings “saw me through” the writing of his “first serious novel.”

By November 1941 Cain had completed two-thirds of the novel, but was struggling with adapting to writing in the third-person, his first effort in that narrative form. Cain wrote publisher Blanche Knopf in 1940: 

The novel required four rewrites before Cain completed Mildred Pierce in the Spring of 1941 and sold it  to Alfred A. Knopf publishers on a $5000 advance.

Critical response

Mildred Pierce was released in September 1941 by Alfred A. Knopf publishers, Literary critic Edmund Wilson introduced the novel in an essay for The New Republic entitled “The Boys in the Back Room.” Biographer Ray Hoopes observed that Wilson’s measured praise “was the first suggestion by a major American critic that Cain had edged his way into the front ranks of American authors.” 

Cain's unsavory characterizations of Mildred and Veda were controversial, but the novel’s plot lacked the sensational devices that many of his fans anticipated. Retail Bookseller predicted that “James Cain fans are likely to find Mildred Pierce decidedly mild and tame.” Reviews of Mildred Pierce were mixed, but on the whole favorable. Never a best-seller, first editions had sold 11,000 hard-cover copies which quickly increased to 14,000 after several weeks. Hundreds of thousands of copies were sold in reprint by 1945,

Theme

The theme of the novel derives from Cain’s female protagonist, Mildred Pierce, a housewife who “uses men to gain her ends”, in achieving financial success as a restaurateur. Mildred’s daughter Veda, in turn, manipulates her mother to advance her musical ambitions. The elements of “food, finance and mothering” appear forcefully, as they did in earlier works, especially Cain’s 1937 novel Serenade. 

The social  and economic hardships of the depression era are co-mingled with Cain’s “obsessive concern with power within heterosexual relationships.” Though never a “social” novelist in the tradition of Theodore Dreiser, Cain’s descriptions of the working class experience are “bitter, incisive and unquestionably authentic.” Critic Paul Skenazy writes:

Cain signaled his intention to treat the larger social landscape of the period when he chose to write Mildred Pierce in the third-person “as against the narrowly defined first-person focused on erotic obsessiveness…” This point-of-view allowed the author to more convincingly “convey a sense of a woman’s perspective.”<ref>Skenazy, 1989 p. 66-67</ref Mildred’s overweening “mothering instinct” directed toward her eldest daughter Veda, almost of a sexual nature, contrasts with her ambivalence towards her husband Monty and men in general. Veda, emulating Mildred, seeks to displace her mother as the dominant female in the relationship, eventually seducing her stepfather. Mildred lives vicariously through her daughter's success as a coloratura opera soprano, despite Veda being “absolutely selfish, deceitful, guileful [and] snobbish.” And p. 65: “...the other face of Cain’s portraits of deception is [a] mothering instinct...most terrifyingly posed in Mildred Pierce’s love for her daughter Veda in Mildred Pierce…” And: p. 66: “...a brilliant and brutal depiction of the underside of domestic affection.” And p. 72-73: See here for nature of the Mildred/Veda relationship.Madden, 1970 p. 74: Veda portrayed as “a through-going bitch…Cain is a masterful creator of bitches”, among them Veda Pierce. See p. 74 for “absolutely selfish…” quote.Hoopes, 1982 p. 373: See here for critical response to Cain’s creation of unsavory characters, “monster-monger.”</ref> Biographer David Madden observes:

Adaptations

1945 film adaption

Cain was first approached about a film adaptation of Mildred Pierce by Warner Brothers producer Jerry Wald in 1943. Though Cain declined Wald’s request to write a film treatment, Wald—known as a producer of films appealing to women moviegoers—continued to seek a suitable screenwriter. In the spring of 1944, Warners purchased the film rights for $15,000,  
When Cain received Wald’s proposed treatments, the producer had inserted a murder into the story, and according to Cain, had failed to emphasize the dramatic implications “of having a big coloratura soprano in the family.” When filmmaker Michael Curtiz was enlisted to direct Mildred Pierce, Cain urged him to avoid introducing hard-boiled themes and rather emphasize the novel’s “wider implication… Mildred Pierce is one woman’s struggle against a great social injustice—which is the mother’s necessity to support her children even though husband and community give her not the slightest assistance.” Literary critic Paul Skenazy notes the impact that Cain’s novels had on 1940s filmmaking in America:

The film was a box-office success. According to Warner Bros., it earned $3,483,000 in the U.S. and $2,155,000 in other markets.

Other adaptions

1954: An hour-long radio play of the novel was first broadcast by the Lux Radio Theatre on the NBC Radio Network on 14th June 1954 starring Zachary Scott (also in the 1945 film) and Claire Trevor.

1993: A 90-minute dramatization by John Fletcher for the Radio Noir series for Saturday Night Theatre on BBC Radio 4 was first broadcast on 26th June 1993.  Shelley Thompson played the title role with Martin Jarvis as Monte Beragon and Ed Bishop as Bert Pierce.

2011: Director Todd Haynes filmed a five-part miniseries for television, with Kate Winslet as Mildred, Guy Pearce as Monty Beragon, and Evan Rachel Wood as Veda, in Spring 2010 (with Morgan Turner as the young Veda). Haynes wrote the script with Jon Raymond and served as an executive producer with Pamela Koffler, John Wells, Ilene S. Landress, and Christine Vachon, along with HBO in association with Metro-Goldwyn-Mayer.

The miniseries aired on HBO, starting on March 27, 2011, and ending with a two-part finale on April 10, 2011. Unlike the movie version, it is almost a word-for-word dramatization of the novel, including nearly every scene and using Cain's dialogue. It features period music performed by Vince Giordano and the Nighthawks Orchestra.

See also

 1941 in literature

Footnotes

Sources

Als, Hilton..2011.This woman's work: James M. Cain on the grass widow. The New Yorker. (21 March 2011). Retrieved 12 May, 2022 from: https://www.newyorker.com/magazine/2011/03/28/this-womans-work 
Byrne, Paul.  2011.  Spoilt. The Herald. (20 June 2011) Retrieved 12 May 2022 from: https://www.independent.ie/regionals/herald/entertainment/tv-radio/spoilt-27982804.html
Glancy, Mark H. 1995. Warner Bros Film Grosses, 1921–51: The William Shaefer Ledger. Historical Journal of Film, Radio and Television. 15: 26. doi:10.1080/01439689508604551.
Hoopes, Roy. 1982. Cain. Holt, Reinhart and Winston. New York. 
Madden, David. 1970. James M. Cain. Twayne Publishers, Inc. Library Catalog Card Number: 78-120011.
Skenazy, Paul. 1989. James M. Cain. Continuum Publishing Company. New York. 
 

1941 American novels
Alfred A. Knopf books
American crime novels
American novels adapted into films
Glendale, California
Novels adapted into radio programs
American novels adapted into television shows
Novels by James M. Cain
Novels set in California
Hardboiled crime novels